Alberta Rosemarie Katherina Mayne (born 10 November 1980) is a Canadian actress, theatre producer and social activist from Calgary, Alberta. In 2000, she ran a theatre company out of Vancouver. In 2006, she started to focus on film and television, landing roles in television movies such as The Ties that Bind. In 2007, she was part of two films that premiered in the Toronto International Film Festival; she was featured in Battle in Seattle and a supporting lead in The Soft Revolution. She then went to land guest star roles in The L Word, Fringe, Psych, as well as supporting roles in television movies and feature films. Most recently she had a leading role in The Bouquet starring Danny Glover and Kristy Swanson, with theatrical released in 2013.

Filmography
 Pure Pwnage (2016) ... Studio Executive
 Dark Intentions (2015) ... Roberta
 Supernatural (2014) ... Mrs. Chandler
 The Brittany Murphy Movie (2014) ... Ashley 
 Chop Shop (2014) ... Officer Benton
 The Bouquet (2013) ... Mandy Benton
 Salesmen (2012) ... Vanessa
 Psych (2011) ... Gemma Kramer
 The List (2010) (TV) ... Sarah
 Fringe (2010)
 Transparency (2010) ... Joyce
 A Trace Of Danger (2010) (TV)
 Night at the Museum: Battle of the Smithsonian (2009) ... Greta Zimmer Friedman (Kissing Nurse)
 The L Word (2008) ... Gina
 Vice (2008) ... Chris
 The Soft Revolution
 Battle in Seattle (2007) ... Protester
 This Space for Rent (2007)
 Ties That Bind (2007) ... Karen
 After Tomorrow (2006) ... Tory

References

External links
 

1980 births
Actresses from Calgary
Canadian film actresses
Living people